Zurich Bog is a  sphagnum bog in Arcadia, New York.  Lyman Stuart and the Newark School District donated the land on December 10, 1957 to the Bergen Swamp Preservation Society which had been created in 1935 to preserve the similar Bergen-Byron Swamp. The bog has been the focus of scientific interest since the 19th century, and was declared a National Natural Landmark in May 1973.

See also
List of National Natural Landmarks in New York

References

External links
Bergen Swamp Preservation Society page
Map and directions

National Natural Landmarks in New York (state)
Protected areas of Wayne County, New York
Landforms of Wayne County, New York
Nature reserves in New York (state)
Wetlands of New York (state)
Bogs of the United States